Giles Penny is a British sculptor and painter. Some of his work is exhibited outdoors in Canary Wharf.

Penny is a member of the Royal British Society of Sculptors. Felicity Green selected a sculpture by Giles Penny as her luxury item for Desert Island Discs.

Gallery

References

1962 births
British sculptors
Living people